"Beautiful Times" is a song by American electronica project Owl City. The song features American violinist Lindsey Stirling and was released on April 8, 2014 as the lead single from his fourth EP, Ultraviolet.

Background
In early 2014, Young revealed the album artwork for his single, "Beautiful Times", through his Instagram account. On April 4, 2014, Owl City released a teaser for "Beautiful Times". Written and produced by Young, the track runs at 136 BPM and is in the key of A major. The song has been described as an "upbeat" track. The song features Lindsey Stirling who played violin on the track.

Critical reception
Christian Rockafeller of Music Times calls the music video "a gorgeous and whimsical cinematic tale." Musically, he praised Stirling's violin skills stating it as "inimitable" and "impressive."

Music video
On June 26, 2014, the music video for "Beautiful Times" premiered via Rolling Stone. Speaking about the video he stated, "I've been on a few sets where everyone is on edge and it throws the whole thing off. A positive atmosphere really makes all the difference in the world." The music video showcases a young protagonist waking up and venturing beyond his own world, while it features clips of Young and Stirling performing the song.

Credits and personnel
Credits adapted from AllMusic.

 Owl City – composer, primary artist
 Lindsey Stirling – featured artist

Charts

Release history

References

2014 songs
2014 singles
Owl City songs